The 2010 Men's EuroHockey Junior Championship was the 15th edition of the men's EuroHockey Junior Championship, the biennial international men's under-21 field hockey championship of Europe organised by the European Hockey Federation. It was held in Siemianowice Śląskie, Poland from 25 to 31 July 2010.

The Netherlands won the tournament for the seventh time after defeating the Belgium 4–1 in the final. Germany won the bronze model by defeating England 4–3.

Qualified teams
The following eight team qualified based on their final positions in the 2008 EuroHockey Junior Championships.

Results

Preliminary round

Pool A

Pool B

Classification round

Fifth to eighth place classification
Points obtained in the preliminary round are carried over into Pool C.

Pool C

First to fourth place classification

Semi-finals

Third and fourth place

Final

Statistics

Final standings

Goalscorers

References

EuroHockey Junior Championship
Junior 1
International field hockey competitions hosted by Poland
EuroHockey Junior Championship
EuroHockey Junior Championship
EuroHockey Championship
Siemianowice Śląskie
Sport in Silesian Voivodeship